Trety Reshayushchy is a rural locality (a settlement) in Frunzenskoye Rural Settlement, Sredneakhtubinsky District, Volgograd Oblast, Russia. The population was 334 as of 2010. There are 15 streets.

The name of settlement which means "Third Decisive" is very unusual and is probably related to the Soviet tradition of naming third year of five-year plan "decisive".

Geography 
Trety Reshayushchy is located 14 km west of Srednyaya Akhtuba (the district's administrative centre) by road. Rybachy is the nearest rural locality.

References 

Rural localities in Sredneakhtubinsky District